Temnostethus pusillus is a true bug in the family Anthocoridae. The species is found in the West Palearctic. It is a small zoophage frequently occurring on ash or apple bark where it preys on aphids, leaf suckers, and scale insects (Coccidae)

References

External links
Temnostethus  pusillus images at  Consortium for the Barcode of Life
Fauna Europaea

Anthocoridae
Insects described in 1835